The 1909–10 Northern Rugby Football Union season was the 15th season of rugby league football.

Season summary
Aberdare, Barry and Mid-Rhondda had dropped out, leaving 28 teams.

Oldham won their second Championship this season. After finishing top of the regular season table, they went on to beat Wigan 13-7 in the play-off final.

The Challenge Cup Winners were Leeds who defeated Hull F.C. 26-12 in replay after a 7-7 draw.

At the close of the season, the Northern Union's leading players were selected to go on the 1910 Great Britain Lions tour of Australia and New Zealand.

Oldham won the Lancashire League, and Wakefield Trinity won the Yorkshire League. Wigan beat Leigh 22–5 to win the Lancashire Cup, and Huddersfield beat Batley 21–0 to win the Yorkshire County Cup.

Championship

Championship play-off

Challenge Cup

Leeds played Hull in the Challenge Cup Final the match ended in a 7-7 draw. The replay resulted in Leeds defeating Hull 26-12. This was Leeds' first Cup Final win in their first Cup Final appearance. Hull lost their third Cup Final in a row.

First match

Leeds: 7

Leeds Tries: Walter Goldthorpe

Leeds Goals: Frank Young 2

Hull FC: 7

Hull FC Tries: G. T. Cottrell

Hull FC Goals:  (E. or Ned) Rogers, Harry Wallace

Half-time: 2-7

Attendance: 19,413 (at Fartown Ground, Huddersfield)

Teams:

Hull FC: Harry Taylor, G. T. Cottrell, Jim Devereux, Andy Morton,  (E. or Ned) Rogers, Harry Wallace, Billie Anderson, Tom Herridge, Will Osborne, Dick Taylor, William Holder, G. Connell, H. Walton

Leeds: Frank Young, J. Fawcett, Walter Goldthorpe, C. Gillie, F. Barron, E. Ware, J. Sanders, W. Biggs, Billy Jarman, Fred Harrison, Harry Topham, Fred Webster, Billy Ward

Replay

Leeds: 26

Leeds Tries: Rowe, Walter Goldthorpe, Fred Webster, Harry Topham

Leeds Goals: Frank Young 7

Hull FC: 12

Hull FC Tries: G. Connell, H. Walton

Hull FC Goals:  (E. or Ned) Rogers 3

Half-time: 16-0

Attendance: 11,608 (at Fartown Ground, Huddersfield)

Teams:

Leeds: Frank Young, Harold Rowe, Walter Goldthorpe, C. Gillie, F. Barron, E. Ware, J. Fawcett, Fred Webster, Fred Harrison, Harry Topham, Billy Ward, Billy Jarman, S. Whittaker

Hull FC: E. Rogers, G. T. Cottrell, Jim Devereux, Andy Morton, Ernest Atkinson,  (G. or Ned) Rogers, Harry Wallace, Tom Herridge, Will Osborne, Dick Taylor, William Holder, G. Connell, H. Walton

Sources
1909-10 Rugby Football League season at wigan.rlfans.com
The Challenge Cup at The Rugby Football League website

References

1909 in English rugby league
1910 in English rugby league
Northern Rugby Football Union seasons
1909 in Welsh rugby league
1910 in Welsh rugby league